Pilgrim Hospital is a hospital in the east of Lincolnshire on the A16, north of the town of Boston near the mini-roundabout with the A52. It is situated virtually on the Greenwich Meridian and adjacent to Boston High School. The fenland area of Lincolnshire is covered by this hospital, being the county's second largest hospital after Lincoln County Hospital. It is managed by United Lincolnshire Hospitals NHS Trust.

History

The hospital has its origins in temporary premises which opened as the Boston Cottage Hospital in 1871. A purpose-built facility designed by William Henry Wheeler was built in Bath Gardens between 1874 and 1875. Additions included an outpatients' department completed in 1926, a nurses' home in 1934 and a maternity wing in 1936. The facility joined the National Health Service in 1948.

Following a design competition held in 1961, a completely new building was designed by the Building Design Partnership, one of its earliest public buildings, under Sir George Grenfell-Baines. The first phase of the new hospital, named after the town's Pilgrim Fathers, opened in 1971, and after the subsequent phases were completed, the new facility was officially opened by Princess Anne on 23 June 1977.

The £2.1 million medical education centre was built in late 1992 by Lindum Construction (for the Trent Regional Health Authority). It was later renovated by Taylor Pearson of Woodhall Spa in April 2008.

In 2010, the Energy Centre was overhauled. Cofely (part of GDF Suez) installed a 526 kWe engine-based CHP, supplied by GE Jenbacher, which is supplemented by a 2.9 MW woodchip-fuelled biomass steam boiler, supplied by Binder of Austria, with further conventional dual fuel steam boilers. The wood chips are locally sourced from Thetford Forest.

In June 2011 a £2.5 million renovation began on the Endoscopy unit.

Facilities

The main part of the hospital consists of a ten-storey building. It has twenty wards and has a busy maternity unit. Just north of the building there is a helicopter landing pad, used by the Lincolnshire & Nottinghamshire Air Ambulance.

An innovative way of managing hip fractures developed since May 2012, has seen the hospital recognised as the best in the country for treating patients with broken hips with 30 day mortality of 6% compared with a national average of 9% and an average length of stay of 11.6 days compared with a national figure of 23 days.

The Care Quality Commission raised concerns about the treatment of children in the emergency department, and about the early detection of critically ill patients.

See also
 List of hospitals in England
 Peterborough City Hospital

References

External links
 NHS Choices

Hospital buildings completed in 1976
Hospitals in Lincolnshire
Buildings and structures in Boston, Lincolnshire
NHS hospitals in England